James A. Daley (born 1941) is an American former diplomat. He was sworn in as the U.S. Ambassador to Barbados, Antigua and Barbuda, the Commonwealth of Dominica, Grenada, St. Lucia, St. Kitts and Nevis, and St. Vincent and the Grenadines on August 21, 2000.  He served until 2001.

At the time of his appointment, Daley was a member of the Board of Directors for the LoJack Corporation in Massachusetts and was a member of the Board of Directors of the Massachusetts Convention Center Authority. Daley has been an executive in the hospitality industry, serving as president or as director of the Back Bay Hilton Hotel, Daley Hotel Management Corporation, Copley Plaza Hotel, Boston Copley Plaza Hotel Corporation, M&D Restaurant, Inc, and JND Hotels, Inc.

References

1941 births
Living people
21st-century American businesspeople
21st-century American diplomats
Ambassadors of the United States to Barbados
Ambassadors of the United States to Antigua and Barbuda
Ambassadors of the United States to Dominica
Ambassadors of the United States to Saint Lucia
Ambassadors of the United States to Saint Kitts and Nevis
Ambassadors of the United States to Saint Vincent and the Grenadines
Ambassadors of the United States to Grenada
American hoteliers